

History 
Statgraphics Centurion is a statistical statistics package that performs and explains in plain language, both basic and highly advanced statistical functions. The software was created in 1980 by Dr. Neil W. Polhemus while on the faculty at the Princeton University School of Engineering and Applied Science for use as an advanced teaching tool for his statistics students. It soon became evident that the software would be useful to the business community at large, thus it was made available to the public in 1982, becoming the highest selling analytical program in the world for the entire decade and well into the 1990s, and the first data science software designed for use on the PC. 
Statgraphics Centurion 18.2.14, was initially released in October 2017 with subsequent free updates released periodically to improve the platform and add new functions. New upgrade versions, with added capability and many newly designed features and enhancements, are released every two to three years. Statgraphics has been the software of choice for quality professionals, research scientists, academics and industrial concerns with global clients that include over 40% of the Fortune 500 companies and smaller concerns pursuing best practices, as well as many of the most prominent educational institutions in the world. It is designed to serve those whose profession requires analysis of data for business intelligence, predictive analytics, Six Sigma and other sophisticated statistical protocols.

Contents 
Version 18, offered in both 32-bit and 64-bit editions, is available in five languages: English, French, Spanish, German and Italian. The 64-bit edition is capable of computing very large sized data sets bringing it into the realm of "big data" analytics. The current version is Statgraphics a Windows Desktop application with extensive capabilities for regression analysis, ANOVA, multivariate statistics, Design of Experiments, statistical process control, life data analysis, data visualization and beyond. It features 260 plus procedures. Everything from summary statistics to advanced statistical models in an exceptionally easy to use format. It contains more than 260 data analysis procedures, including descriptive statistics, hypothesis testing, regression analysis, analysis of variance, survival analysis, time series analysis and forecasting, sample size determination, multivariate methods and Monte Carlo techniques. The SPC menu includes many procedures for quality assessment, capability analysis, control charts, measurement systems analysis, and acceptance sampling. The program also features a DOE Wizard that creates and analyzes statistically designed experiments. Version 18 added several machine learning methods and as previously mentioned, capability to deal with Big Data, as well as an R interface. A Python interface will be included in the next version, Statgraphics Centurion 19, due for release in 2020. 
Stratus™ is a cloud-based SaaS program which runs on PC, Mac, Linux, smart phones and tablets and which contains most of the primary capabilities needed by analysts for routine data analysis anywhere an internet connection is available, allowing 24/7/365 access. Calculations are performed remotely on Statgraphics servers with results returned to the user's browser as HTML.

Sigma express™ is an Excel add-in that gives quick access to the entire Statgraphics Six Sigma toolbox of statistical techniques within Excel. Ideal for analysts who are comfortable in the Excel environment but need more extensive statistical capability necessary to implement successful Six Sigma projects and other analytical assignments.

Statbeans™ is a collection of Java Beans which implement many commonly used statistical procedures,
designed to be embedded in user-created applications or placed on web pages. Their structure as a
component library enables simple manipulation in various visual environments.

Statgraphics®.Net Web Services enable web application developers to call Statgraphics procedures
from their web pages. Data and instructions are passed to the Web Servers as XML. This product can
be embedded in OEM proprietary applications or can be integrated into a dashboard.

Applications 
Statgraphics is frequently used for Six Sigma process improvement. The program has also been used in various health and nutrition-related studies. The software is heavily used in manufacturing chemicals, pharmaceuticals, medical devices, automobiles, food and consumer goods. It is also widely used in mining, environmental studies, and basic R&D. Government agencies such as NASA and the EPA also use the program, as do many colleges and universities around the world.

Distribution 
Statgraphics is distributed by Statgraphics Technologies, Inc.,  a privately held company based in The Plains, Virginia.

See also
 List of statistical packages
 Comparison of statistical packages
 List of information graphics software

References

Statistical software
Science software for Windows